|}

The Castleford Chase is a National Hunt handicap steeplechase (horse racing) in Great Britain which is open to horses aged four years or older.. It is run over a distance of about 1 mile and 7 furlongs (1 mile 7 furlongs and 36 yards, or 3,050 metres) at Wetherby Racecourse in late December. There are thirteen fences to be jumped in the race.

The Castleford Chase's recent history has seen a number of changes in conditions and status. Until 1989 it was run as a limited handicap. In 1990 it was upgraded to a Grade 1 race and run as a conditions chase for the first time. From 1998 it reverted to a limited handicap and was downgraded to Grade 2 status. In 2006 it was replaced as a Grade 2 chase in the calendar by Kempton Park's newly inaugurated Desert Orchid Chase and became a handicap chase for horses rated between 0 and 145.

Winners since 1975

See also
 Horse racing in Great Britain
 List of British National Hunt races

References

Racing Post:

National Hunt races in Great Britain
Wetherby Racecourse
National Hunt chases